Giovanny Patricio Espinoza Pabón (born 12 April 1977) is a former Ecuadorian footballer who played as a defender.

Club career
His strong physique and speed helped his old club side LDU Quito win two league championships in 2001 and 2004. His nickname is La Sombra, which translates as "the shadow", because of his size, he creates large shadows.

In the 2006 edition of the FIFA World Cup, Espinoza was nominated for a place in FIFA's ideal 11, which rewards the top players in each position.

On 25 January 2007, Giovanny Espinoza was transferred from LDU Quito to Vitesse. There he has to replace Ruud Knol. He signed for one-a-half-year until June 2008. On 10 February 2007, he made his Eredivisie debut for Vitesse against SC Heerenveen. The following match, he made his first appearance at home in a 0–0 draw against Roda JC, coming on as a substitute in the 66th minute for Colin van Mourik. The following season, he became a regular starter.

On 14 January 2008, Espinoza was signed by Brazilian club Cruzeiro. He captained of the side and showed some very impressive displays and leadership on the field.
There were many rumors swirling around in late 2008, some had Espinoza signing with Argentinian struggling giants, River Plate and that unspecified English teams were also on the hunt for La Sombra. On 15 January 2009, it was confirmed that Espinoza would be playing for Barcelona Sporting Club and that his presence was asked by the head coach Benito Floro. His final club was Deportivo Quito.

Birmingham City
In June 2009, Espinoza's agent claimed that a fee had been agreed for the player to move to English Premier League club Birmingham City, and the parties were only awaiting final paperwork for the deal to be completed. The two-year deal was confirmed on 24 June 2009, where he will play alongside compatriot Christian Benítez. Espinoza was an unused substitute in the league game against Stoke City on 22 August 2009, and made his Birmingham debut three days later, playing the whole of the 2–1 second round League Cup win away against Southampton. On 12 January 2010 his contract with Birmingham was cancelled by mutual consent, having only made two League Cup appearances for the club.

Unión Española
In 2010, Giovanny Espinoza signed for Unión Española on loan for a contract of three years.

Deportivo Quito
In January 2012, he signed a contract with Deportivo Quito for the 2012 season.

International career
He was named in the Ecuador national side for the 2002 and 2006 FIFA World Cups. He currently is the seventh highest capped player for his country behind Luis Capurro with 100 caps. He made his international debut in 1996 just a week after his 19th birthday in a World Cup qualification match where Ecuador beat Peru 4–1.

Espinoza and Hurtado together hold the international record for the longest unbroken pairing in the position of centre half – they have played the last 65 games together, dating back to 1999. This is partly due to South American nations playing more international qualification matches than any other region. In the 2006 edition of the FIFA World Cup, Espinoza was nominated for a place in FIFA's ideal 11, which rewards the top players in each position. He was also included in Ecuador's squad for the 2001, 2004, and 2007 Copas America.

References

External links

Giovanni Espinoza at PlayMakerStats

1977 births
Living people
People from Ibarra, Ecuador
Association football central defenders
Ecuadorian footballers
Ecuador international footballers
S.D. Aucas footballers
C.F. Monterrey players
L.D.U. Quito footballers
SBV Vitesse players
Cruzeiro Esporte Clube players
C.S.D. Independiente del Valle footballers
Barcelona S.C. footballers
Birmingham City F.C. players
Bristol City F.C. players
Unión Española footballers
S.D. Quito footballers
Ecuadorian Serie A players
Liga MX players
Eredivisie players
Campeonato Brasileiro Série A players
Premier League players
English Football League players
Chilean Primera División players
2001 Copa América players
2002 FIFA World Cup players
2002 CONCACAF Gold Cup players
2004 Copa América players
2006 FIFA World Cup players
2007 Copa América players
Ecuadorian expatriate footballers
Ecuadorian expatriate sportspeople in Mexico
Ecuadorian expatriate sportspeople in the Netherlands
Ecuadorian expatriate sportspeople in Brazil
Ecuadorian expatriate sportspeople in England
Ecuadorian expatriate sportspeople in Chile
Expatriate footballers in Mexico
Expatriate footballers in the Netherlands
Expatriate footballers in Brazil
Expatriate footballers in England
Expatriate footballers in Chile